Antoinette Geraldine Mackeson-Sandbach (born 15 February 1969), known as Antoinette Sandbach, is a former British politician who was elected as Member of Parliament for Eddisbury in Cheshire at the 2015 general election.

The following day, 8 May 2015, she resigned as the Welsh Assembly Member for the North Wales region, having been elected as a North Wales regional Assembly Member at the May 2011 election. First elected as a Conservative, Sandbach had the Conservative whip removed on 3 September 2019 and later lost a vote of no confidence by the Eddisbury Conservative  Association. Following deselection as a Conservative, Antoinette Sandbach chose eventually to become a Liberal Democrat. She lost her seat to her former party in the 2019 general election.

Early life
Born in Hammersmith, West London, Sandbach is the eldest of four sisters.

Her paternal grandmother was Geraldine Mackeson-Sandbach, a prominent landowner in North Wales, whose estates included Hafodunos near Abergele and Bryngwyn Hall near Llanfyllin. Her mother, Annie Marie Antoinette of the Dutch Van Lanschot family married Ian Mackeson-Sandbach in 1967.

Antoinette Sandbach was educated at Haileybury and Imperial Service College and the University of Nottingham, where she studied law, and practised as a criminal barrister in London for 13 years, latterly at 9 Bedford Row chambers. She was twice elected to the Bar Council in that time.

She then ran the family farming business, Hafodunos Farms Ltd, at Llangernyw in the Elwy valley of North Wales from where she embarked on a political career.

Political career
In the 2007 Welsh Assembly election, Sandbach contested the Labour-held constituency of Delyn. She lost, but achieved a swing of 3.7% from Labour to Conservative and Labour narrowly held the seat by just 511 votes. Sandbach contested the Delyn parliamentary constituency in the 2010 general election, but lost again, though achieving a larger swing of 6.7% from Labour to Conservative. Following the death of Brynle Williams in 2011, she became a Conservative Regional Assembly Member for North Wales.

During her time in the Assembly she was appointed Shadow Rural Affairs Minister. In 2014, she was appointed Shadow Minister for the Environment. Sandbach also sat on the Assembly's Environment and Sustainability Committee.

In March 2015, Sandbach was selected as the Conservative Party candidate for the Conservative-held seat of Eddisbury in Cheshire, England. She held the safe Conservative seat with a majority of nearly 13,000, and promptly resigned from the Welsh Assembly, to be succeeded by Janet Haworth.

On entering the House she was elected to the Welsh Affairs Select Committee and the Energy and Climate Change Select Committee, which she sat on until it was disbanded in October 2016. In March 2017, she was elected on to the Business, Energy and Industrial Strategy Select Committee and has subsequently been re-elected to the Committee since the 2017 General Election. She was also an elected executive member of the 1922 Committee of backbench Conservative MPs since 2015.

One of her main policy interests is improving services for those who suffer the loss of a baby. Following a debate in the House of Commons in November 2015, she helped set up the All-Party Parliamentary Group on Baby Loss, of which she was also appointed co-chair. Since its formation the group has made recommendations to the Department of Health and has been working closely with Ministers to improve policy in this area.

Sandbach has been a strong advocate for improving representation of women in the workforce. In some of her first appearances in the House she raised the issue of encouraging more girls to study Science, Technology, Engineering and Maths subjects in order for them to access those highly paid, highly skilled jobs and reduce the gap between men and women in the workplace.

Sandbach supported the United Kingdom remaining within the European Union (EU) in the 2016 EU membership referendum. In the referendum, the UK voted to leave the EU (Brexit). She retained the Eddisbury seat at the 2017 United Kingdom general election, with a majority of 11,942.

Sandbach was one of 11 Conservative MPs to rebel against then Prime Minister Theresa May's government in voting for an amendment to the European Union (Withdrawal) Act 2018 on 13 December 2017, which guaranteed MPs a vote on the final Brexit deal agreed with the European Union. She voted for May's withdrawal agreement on all three opportunities.

Sandbach endorsed Rory Stewart during the 2019 Conservative leadership election. She was one of 21 Conservative MPs who had their whip withdrawn on 3 September after rebelling against the government by voting for opposition MPs to control the parliamentary process to try to prevent a no-deal Brexit, after which she sat as an Independent. On 12 September, she declared her support for a referendum on the Brexit withdrawal agreement. On 15 October 2019 the members of the Eddisbury Conservative Association passed a motion of no confidence in her. She commented that the local Conservatives were "an unrepresentative handful of people" and they should not get to decide the question.

On 31 October 2019, it was announced that Sandbach would stand in her constituency as a Liberal Democrat candidate. On 12 December, standing as a Liberal Democrat, she lost her seat to the Conservative candidate, Edward Timpson. Timpson received 30,095 of votes and Sandbach received 9,582 votes.

She remains the Parliamentary spokesperson for Eddsibury Liberal Democrats.

Personal life
Sandbach's daughter Sacha was born in 2002. Sandbach separated from Sacha's father in 2003 and moved back to her family estate in 2005. She lost a five-day-old son, Sam, to sudden infant death syndrome in 2009 and married Matthew Sherratt, a sculptor, in 2012.

Sandbach is believed to be the tallest woman to sit in the UK parliament, her height stated to be  in 2019.

References

External links
Official website of Antoinette Sandbach MP

Biography at National Assembly for Wales

|-

|-

1969 births
Alumni of the University of Nottingham
Conservative Party members of the Senedd
Conservative Party (UK) MPs for English constituencies
Independent members of the House of Commons of the United Kingdom
Female members of the Senedd
Female members of the Parliament of the United Kingdom for English constituencies
Living people
People educated at Haileybury and Imperial Service College
Wales AMs 2011–2016
Welsh barristers
UK MPs 2015–2017
UK MPs 2017–2019
Liberal Democrats (UK) MPs for English constituencies
People from Hammersmith
Welsh people of Dutch descent
21st-century Welsh women
21st-century Welsh people